was a town located in Aida District, Okayama Prefecture, Japan.

As of 2003, the town had an estimated population of 7,577 and a density of 69.49 persons per km². The total area was 109.03 km².

On March 31, 2005, Sakutō, along with the towns of Mimasaka (former), Aida and Ōhara, the village of Higashiawakura (all from Aida District), and the town of Katsuta (from Katsuta District), was merged to create the city of Mimasaka.

Geography

Adjoining municipalities
Okayama Prefecture
Mimasaka (town)
Ōhara
Aida
Katsuta
Bizen
Hyōgo Prefecture
Sayō
Kōzuki

Education
Emi Elementary School
Doi Elementary School
Awai Elementary School
Yoshino Elementary School (Closure in 2008)
Sakutō Junior High School
Okayama Prefectural Emi Commercial High School (Closure in 2009)

Sister cities
 Saint-Valentin (France)
 Sankt Valentin (Austria)
 Saint-Valentin (Canada)

Transportation

Railways
West Japan Railway Company
Kishin Line
Mimasaka-Doi Station - Mimasaka-Emi Station

Road
Expressways:
Chūgoku Expressway
Sakutō Interchange
National highways:
Route 179
Route 429
Prefectural roads:
Okayama Prefectural Route 5 (Sakutō-Ōhara)
Okayama Prefectural Route 46 (Wake-Sasame-Sakutō)
Okayama Prefectural Route 161 (Ichiba-Sayō)
Okayama Prefectural Route 358 (Sagisu-Mizoguchi)
Okayama Prefectural Route 360 (Manzen-Mimasaka)
Okayama Prefectural Route 365 (Kamifukuhara-Sayō)
Okayama Prefectural Route 479 (Seto-Munakake)

Notable places and events

Valentine Park Sakutō

External links
Official website of Mimasaka in Japanese

Dissolved municipalities of Okayama Prefecture
Mimasaka, Okayama